is a Japanese manga artist. He is most noted for Yokohama Kaidashi Kikō, for which he won the 2007 Seiun Award for Best Science Fiction Manga. Another notable work is PositioN. Prior to his debut, Ashinano worked as an assistant to manga artist Kōsuke Fujishima.

Works
 (2014–2017)
 (2007–2013, Afternoon)
Kumabachi no koto (February 2007, Afternoon)
Touge (July 2006, Afternoon) (included in the 10th volume of the new edition of Yokohama Kaidashi Kikō)
PositioN (1999–2001, Afternoon Season Zōkan and Bessatsu Morning)
Turbo Type S (2006, tribute manga for E no Moto)
Yokohama Kaidashi Kikō (1994–2006, Afternoon)

References

1963 births
Living people
Manga artists from Kanagawa Prefecture
People from Yokosuka, Kanagawa
Kōsuke Fujishima